Kirkwood Observatory is an astronomical observatory owned and operated by Indiana University. It is located in Bloomington, Indiana, United States. It is named for Daniel Kirkwood (1814–1895) an astronomer and professor of mathematics at Indiana University who discovered the divisions of the asteroid belt known as the Kirkwood Gaps.

Description 
Built in 1900 and dedicated on May 15, 1901, the observatory was thoroughly renovated during the 2001–02 academic year. Although the facility is no longer used for research, its original refracting telescope, built by Warner & Swasey Company with a 12-inch (0.3-meter) Brashear objective lens, also received a complete restoration. The telescope is now used regularly for outreach events and undergraduate-level classes. Kirkwood Observatory also has an instructional solar telescope.

Directors 
 John A. Miller (1901–06)
 Wilbur A. Cogshall (1907–44)
 Frank K. Edmondson (1944–78)

See also 
 1764 Cogshall, asteroid named after W. A. Cogshall
 List of observatories

References

External links 
 Topographical map from TopoQuest
 Bloomington Clear Sky Clock Forecasts of observing conditions covering Kirkwood Observatory.

Astronomical observatories in Indiana
Indiana University Bloomington
Tourist attractions in Bloomington, Indiana
Buildings and structures in Bloomington, Indiana